Munak may refer to:

Munak, Haryana in India 
Munak, Nicobar in India
 Munak canal in India
Munak, Khuzestan in Iran
Munak, Lorestan in Iran